Vallée de Chevreuse (Chevreuse Valley) is the valley of the Yvette River in the Yvelines and Essonne departments.

It encompasses the communes around Chevreuse (Saint-Rémy-lès-Chevreuse, Choisel, Dampierre, etc.) within the Parc naturel régional de la haute vallée de Chevreuse and communes further downstream until Palaiseau: Gif-sur-Yvette, Bures-sur-Yvette, Orsay, Villebon-sur-Yvette, etc.

External links
 http://www.parc-naturel-chevreuse.fr
 http://www.vallee-de-chevreuse.com

Landforms of Essonne
Landforms of Yvelines
Valleys of France
Landforms of Île-de-France